The National Council for Geographic Education (NCGE), chartered in 1915, is a non-profit scientific and educational society in the United States that promotes and supports geography education.

Annual conference 
NCGE holds an annual conference every summer, called the National Conference on Geography Education. This annual event offers hands-on workshops in new teaching methods, technologies, resources, as well as research papers, networking opportunities, field trips and more. Conference field trips include local and regional places of geographic and historical significance. An exhibit hall is staffed by government, industry, nonprofit, and academic organizations and offers the latest in books, journals, projects, curriculum, software, hardware, and more to support geography teaching. Each conference is highlighted by an annual keynote address. Past keynote speakers have included:

From 1915 to the late 1970s the NCGE conference was held in a few select US cities. In 1979 the conference began rotating its location to a new North American city each year. Since 1979 the NCGE conference has been held in the following locations: Mexico City, Mexico (1979); Des Moines, IA (1980); Pittsburgh, PA (1981); San Diego, CA (1982); Ocho Rios, Jamaica (1983); Toronto, Ontario, Canada (1984); Breckenridge, CO (1985); Chicago, IL (1986); Springfield, MI (1987); Snowbird, UT (1988); Hershey, PA (1989); Williamsburg, VA (1990); St. Paul, MN (1991); Santo Domingo, Dominican Republic (1992); Halifax, Nova Scotia (1993); Lexington, KY (1994); San Antonio, TX (1995); Santa Barbara, CA (1996); Orlando, FL (1997); Indianapolis, IN (1998); Boston, MA (1999); Chicago, IL (2000); Vancouver, British Columbia, Canada (2001); Philadelphia, PA (2002); Salt Lake City, UT (2003); Kansas City, MO (2004); Birmingham, AL (2005); Lake Tahoe, NV (2006); Oklahoma City, OK (2007); Dearborn, MI (2008); San Juan, Puerto Rico (2009); Savannah, GA (2010); Portland, OR (2011); San Marcos, TX (2012); Denver, CO (2013); Memphis, TN (2014); Washington DC (2015); Tampa, FL (2016); Albuquerque, NM (2017); Quebec City, Quebec, Canada (2018).

Partnerships 
The NCGE as an organization actively partners with other organizations, including the Association of American Geographers, The National Council for the Social Studies, and other organizations. Its members are active in the National Science Teachers Association, the North American Association for Environmental Education, the Geographical Association, and in other organizations. Many of its members are also active with the education program of the National Geographic Society and with the National Science Foundation. Some members are active in working with the U.S. Congress on bills and policy that strengthen geography education at all levels, most notably the "Teaching Geography Is Fundamental (TGIF)" Act.

Publications 
The NCGE's weekly email newsletter is published each week. Its contents include geography education news, events, opportunities, and resources.

The NCGE's journals include the Journal of Geography and The Geography Teacher. The Journal has been published for nearly a century, beginning with a different name, while The Geography Teacher began in 2000. The Journal of Geography focuses on research in geography education. It is a scholarly, peer-reviewed journal designed for educators, offering the best in teaching and research advancements in geographic education. JOG publishes research on innovative approaches to teaching and learning, classroom tested lesson ideas, curriculum, book reviews, and more.

The Geography Teacher's focus is on illustrating how geography can be taught in the classroom, through short articles, lesson plans, teaching tips, and news especially relevant for today’s primary, secondary, and pre-service teachers.

Taylor and Francis is the publisher of these journals.

National Geography standards 
NCGE partnered with the National Geographic Society, the Association of American Geographers, and the American Geographical Society during the 1990s to create the national standards for geography, entitled "Geography for Life" (1994). The content standards what students at specific educational levels should know and be expected to do by grades 4, 8, and 12. The National Standards in Geography are organized into 18 standards that encompass six elements.

NCGE played a key role in revising and updating the national standards during the period 2008 to 2012, culminating in the publication of the updated geography standards in September 2012. Revised content captures the growth and importance of geospatial technologies and spatial thinking in geography over the last 18 years. Knowledge statements and performance statements are broken down by grade band (grades 4, 8 and 12).

Other projects 
NCGE members created the Geography Map, a body of skills and exemplary activities, as part of the Partnership for 21st Century Skills. Members of the NCGE also work closely on joint publications, joint participation in conferences, and in research and curriculum development with other organizations, most notably the Geographical Association, the Association of American Geographers, the National Council for the Social Studies, and the North American Association for Environmental Education. The NCGE is also involved with an effort called the "Roadmap" project, funded by National Science Foundation to National Geographic, with a goal to create key documents that define what geographic literacy is and why it is important to education and society.

NCGE holds a webinar series that is open to all and free to members. Topics include teaching with web-based Geographic Information Systems, teaching about the Erie Canal using digital maps, imagery, and geographic inquiry, place-based learning, field work techniques, methods of teaching Advanced Placement Human Geography (APHG), and more. These webinars are conducted by the experts in the respective topics and offer live training as well as the ability to watch the webinar recordings that have been archived.

Presidents 
NCGE Presidents since 1915:

 Richard E. Dodge (1915–1917)
 Albert P. Brigham (1918–1919)
 Ray H. Whitbeck (1920)
 Wallace W. Atwood (1921)
 R.D. Calkins (1922)
 Robert M. Brown (1923)
 William R. McConnell (1924)
 Almon E. Parkins (1925)
 Erna Grassmuck (1926)
 Robert G. Buzzard (1927)
 Leonard O. Packard (1928)
 Nels A. Bentson (1929)
 DeForest Stull (1930)
 Douglas C. Ridgley (1931)
 Zoe A. Thralls (1932)
 George J Miller (1933)
 Edith P. Parker (1934)
 Clyde E. Cooper (1935)
 Alison E. Aitcheson (1936)
 Earl E. Lackey (1937)
 J. Russell Whitaker (1938)
 Edwin H. Reeder (1939)
 Cora P. Sletten (1940)
 Alice Foster (1941)
 Floyd E. Cunningham (1942–1944)
 C. Langdon White (1945)
 Katheryne T. Whittenmore (1946)
 Alfred H. Meyer (1947)
 Thomas F. Barton (1948)
 Earl B. Shaw (1949)
 Loyal Durand, Jr (1950)
 Harry O. Lathrop (1951)
 Clyde F. Kohn (1952)
 Henry J. Warman (1953)
 Otis W. Freeman (1954)
 M. Melvina Svec (1955)
 Norman J. Carls (1956)
 Ina C. Robertson (1957)
 Mary V. Phillips (1958)
 Adelbert K. Botts (1959)
 John W. Morris (1960)
 Jewell A. Phelps (1961)
 Mamie L. Anderzohn (1962)
 Sidney E. Ekblaw (1963)
 Herbert H. Gross (1964)
 Neville V. Scarfe (1965)
 Phillip Bacon (1966)
 Lorrin Kennamer (1967)
 Daniel Jacobson (1968)
 Benjamin F. Richason, Jr. (1969)
 William D. Pattison (1970)
 Robert A. Harper (1971)
 Paul F. Griffin (1972)
 John M. Ball (1973)
 Robert E. Gabler (1974)
 Elizabeth Eiselen (1975)
 Herbert A. Augustine (1976)
 William H. Wake (1977)
 Karl A. Robert (1978)
 Peter V. Greco (1978)
 John F. Lounsbury (1980)
 James M. Goodman (1981)
 Gary A. Manson (1982)
 Richard G. Boehm (1983)
 Walter G. Kemball (1984)
 Gail S. Ludwig (1985)
 Charles F. Gritzner (1986)
 J.B. Kracht / A.R. Longwell (1987)
 A. Richard Longwell (1988)
 Robert W. Morrill (1989)
 Dorothy W. Drummond (1990)
 Norman C. Bettis (1991)
 Michael J. Libbee (1992)
 Douglas A. Phillips (1993)
 M. Duane Nellis (1994)
 Edward A. Fernald (1995)
 James F. Marran (1996)
 Donald J. Ziegler (1997)
 David A. Lanegran (1998)
 Gail A. Hobbs (1999)
 James F. Petersen (2000)
 Robert S. Bednarz (2001)
 Jody Smothers-Marcello (2002)
 Susan W. Hardwick (2003)
 Gwenda H. Rice (2004)
 Martha B. Sharma (2005)
 Kenneth E. Foote (2006)
 Mark H. Bockenhauer (2007)
 Janet Smith (2008)
 Joseph Stoltman (2009)
 Kristin Alvarez (2010)
 Joseph Kerski (2011)
 Eric J. Fournier (2012)
 Paul T. Gray Jr. (2013)
 Michael N. DeMers (2014)
 Susan Hume (2014)
 Larianne Collins (2022-Present)

References

Further reading 
Bednarz, Sarah W. 2000. "Geography Education Research in the Journal of Geography 1988–1997". International Research in Geographical and Environmental Education 9 (2): 128–140.
Dougherty, Percy H. 1984. "National Council for Geographic Education". The Professional Geographer 36 (2): 242.
LeVasseur, Michal L. 1999. "Students' knowledge of geography and geography careers". Journal of Geography 98 (6): 265–271.
 Nellis, M. Duane. 1995. "Geography for life: Today's innovations are tomorrow's traditions". Journal of Geography 94 (1): 302–304.

External links 
 National Council for Geographic Education
 OpenEd's Directory of National Geography Standard Aligned Classroom Resources

Geographic societies
Educational organizations based in the United States
Professional associations based in the United States
Organizations established in 1915
Learned societies of the United States